The Model Land Company Historic District is a U.S. historic district (designated as such on August 2, 1983) located in St. Augustine, Florida. The district is bounded by Ponce de Leon Boulevard, King, Cordova, and Orange Streets. It contains 238 historic buildings.

References

External links
 St. Johns County listings at National Register of Historic Places

St. Augustine, Florida
National Register of Historic Places in St. Johns County, Florida
Historic districts on the National Register of Historic Places in Florida
1983 establishments in Florida